Football Club Cefn is a Welsh football club based in Cefn Mawr, Wrexham County Borough, currently playing in the Welsh National League (Wrexham Area) Premier Division.

Honours

League
Welsh National League (Wrexham Area) Division One
2000–01, 2008–09
Welsh National League (Wrexham Area) Division Two
1999-00

Cup
FAW Trophy
2001–02
Welsh National League (Wrexham Area) Premier Division Cup
2006–07
Welsh National League (Wrexham Area) Division One Cup Winners
2000–01
North East Wales FA Junior (Horace Wynne) Cup Winners
2000–01

Reserve honours
Welsh National League (Wrexham Area) Division Three
2000–01
Welsh National League (Wrexham Area) Division Three Cup
2000–01

References

External links
 Official website

Football clubs in Wales
Welsh National League (Wrexham Area) Premier Division clubs
Sport in Wrexham County Borough
Association football clubs established in 1999
1999 establishments in Wales